Beechworth Asylum, also known in later years as the Beechworth Hospital for the Insane and Mayday Hills Mental Hospital, is a decommissioned hospital located in Beechworth, a town of Victoria, Australia. Mayday Hills Lunatic Asylum was the second such Hospital to be built in Victoria, being one of the three largest. Mayday Hills Hospital closed in 1995, following 128 years of operation.

The asylum was surrounded by almost  of farmland, making the hospital self-sufficient with its own piggery, orchards, kitchen gardens, fields, stables and barn. For recreation, the asylum included tennis courts, an oval and cricket pavilion, kiosk and a theatre.

Ha-ha walls

One of the distinctive features of both Kew Asylum and Beechworth Asylum is the use of a variation on ha-ha walls around the patients courtyards. These ha-has consisted of a trench, one side of which was vertical and faced with stone or bricks, the other side sloped and turfed. From the inside, the walls presented a tall face to patients, preventing them from escaping, while from outside, the walls looked low so as not to suggest imprisonment.

Admission process
People could be admitted to the asylum as a lunatic patient by a number of means:
 At the request of a friend, relative or acquaintance, with medical certificates written by two medical practitioners. This method was amended by The Mental Health Act 1959 which stated a person could be admitted upon the recommendation of a medical practitioner who had examined the person. As soon as possible after admission the superintendent of the hospital was required to examine the patient and either approve the recommended admission or discharge the patient.
 Any (lunatic) person found wandering at large or not under proper care and control could be brought before two justices who could order the person's removal to an asylum. The police were usually responsible for bringing the person before the two justices.
 Any prisoner of the Crown thought to be a lunatic could be removed from a gaol to an asylum by order of the Chief Secretary.
 Voluntary Boarders were those who requested that they be admitted for a mutually agreed period of time (from 1915 onwards).

For a short period of the hospital's history, to be admitted, only two signatures were required. To be discharged, eight signatures were required, thus it was a lot harder to get out than to get in.

Current uses
Beechworth Lunatic Asylum was formerly owned by La Trobe University ]. La Trobe sold the facility in 2013 to a local company composed of two Beechworth businessmen, George Fendyke and Geoff Lucas. The site is now being subdivided and either leased or sold to tourism and arts-based businesses.

Tours currently run through the facility to preserve and showcase the history and architecture. The gardens date to the 19th century, covering 11 hectares, and are open to the public from dawn until dusk.

A venue used for weddings is the Chapel of the Resurrection, to the west of the site. It was built in 1868 as the mortuary for the complex, and was converted to the chapel seen today in the 1960s.

See also

 List of Australian psychiatric institutions
 Aradale Mental Hospital
 Kew Asylum

References

Psychiatric hospitals in Australia
Defunct hospitals in Victoria (Australia)
Beechworth
Hospitals established in 1867
1995 disestablishments in Australia
1867 establishments in Australia